The Vicksburg Group is a geologic group in Georgia. It preserves fossils dating back to the Paleogene period.

See also
 List of fossiliferous stratigraphic units in Georgia (U.S. state)
 Paleontology in Georgia (U.S. state)

References
 

Geologic groups of Georgia (U.S. state)